Torstein Andersen Aase (born 24 October 1991) is a Norwegian football striker who plays for Lyn .

Aase was born in Oslo, the son of Thor Einar Andersen and Kristin Aase. He played youth football in Nordstrand IF, and made his senior team debut before turning 15 years old. After the 2007 season he went from Nordstrand to Stabæk Fotball. Aase moved to KFUM Oslo ahead of the 2013 season.

Career statistics

References

1991 births
Living people
Norwegian footballers
Stabæk Fotball players
KFUM-Kameratene Oslo players
Eliteserien players
Norwegian Second Division players
Norwegian Third Division players
Footballers from Oslo
Association football forwards